HNLMS Delfzijl (M844) is the tenth ship in the City / Vlissingen-class mine countermeasures vessels, and fifth to be built for the Royal Netherlands Navy.

See also
 Future of the Royal Netherlands Navy

References

Minehunters of the Netherlands